The Moutere Inn is located in Upper Moutere in the Tasman District of New Zealand. It is New Zealand's oldest pub to remain operating in its original building. While there are a couple of older licenses still operating, none of them are operating from either their original location or building.

The Moutere Inn was established in 1850 by Cordt Bennseman, a German immigrant. The building has remained largely the same apart from the original verandah being lost when the main bar was extended in the 1960s.

The Inn now specialises in a continually changing range of craft beers, real ales and wines from around the Moutere area.

References

Buildings and structures in the Tasman District
1850s architecture in New Zealand
Pubs
Tasman Bay